High Council may refer to:

Fiction 
 High Council of Time Lords, the governing body of the Time Lords in Doctor Who
 Royal Institute of Maigic: The High Council, the 6th and last book of the Royal Institute of Magic series. 
 High Council, the governmental body of The Covenant faction in the Halo video game series
 High Council, the leadership of the Alliance in the Star Wars New Jedi Order novel series
 High Council of the Landsraad, an inner circle of the Landsraad which arbitrated disputes among Houses in the Dune universe
 Jedi High Council, an institution from the Star Wars film series
 Klingon High Council, the supreme ruling body of the Klingon Empire in the fictional Star Trek universe
 Asgard High Council. the supreme ruling entity of the Asgard race in the fictional Stargate franchise

Religion 
 High council (Latter Day Saints), a governing body that has existed in the church hierarchy of many Mormon/Latter Day Saint denominations
 High Council of B'nei Noah, a group of Noahides who gathered in Israel on Monday January 10, 2006
 High Council of The Salvation Army, the body made up of the Chief of the Staff, active Commissioners, and active Territorial Commanders

Other fields 
 High Council of State (Algeria), a collective Algerian presidency set up by the military in 1992 following the annulled elections in December 1991
 High Council of State (Netherlands)
 High Judicial and Prosecutorial Council, an institution responsible for many aspects of the judicial system in Bosnia and Herzegovina
 Spanish High Council for Scientific Research, a council in Spain
 High Council of the Treaty of Amity and Cooperation in Southeast Asia, charged with the peaceful settlement of disputes.